Aiyura linoptera is a moth in the family Crambidae. It was described by Eugene G. Munroe in 1974. It is found on New Guinea.

References

Moths described in 1974
Spilomelinae
Moths of New Guinea